Nansen Island or Isla Nansen Sur is the largest of the islands lying in Wilhelmina Bay off the west coast of Graham Land, lying  east of Emma Island. Nansen Island was discovered by the Belgian Antarctic Expedition (1897–1899) under Adrien de Gerlache and named for Dr. Fridtjof Nansen, noted Arctic explorer.

See also 
 Composite Antarctic Gazetteer
 Enterprise Island
 List of Antarctic and sub-Antarctic islands
 List of Antarctic islands south of 60° S
 Patcha Point
 SCAR
 Territorial claims in Antarctica

References

External links 
 A picture of Nansen Island
 Picture of an abandoned whaling station on Nansen Island

Danco Coast
Island
Islands of Graham Land